Mobexpert is the largest furniture and accessories distributor in Romania, with 36 stores and one of the largest 12 furniture companies in Europe.

History
The company was founded in 1993 by Dan and Camelia Şucu. The two opened their first store in the Unirea Shopping Center where they sold imported furniture.

In 1994 the company opened their first furniture factory where they produced at first office chairs, then couches and later metallic and plastic furniture pieces.

In 1995 the company started to expand the network and started to buy furniture companies as Samus Dej, Ilefor Târgu Mureş and Mobstrat Suceava.

In 2007 the company opened its first store outside Romania in Sofia, Bulgaria. Another store has been opened in Belgrade, Serbia.

In 2007, Camelia Șucu left the business after her divorce from Dan Șucu. She said, in an interview for LIFE.ro, that she had only 40% from the business because of the cultural Romanian thinking: "Exit-ul din Mobexpert a fost pentru mine o alegere pe care a trebuit să o fac pentru că am fost acționar minoritar, aveam 40% din cele 18 firme care făceau parte din grupul Mobexpert. Am acceptat acest 40% pentru că pe atunci nu aveam cultura legislativă necesară, și nu aveam o cultură de om care să considere că este foarte important să ai aceleași drepturi chiar și când partenerul tău de afaceri este același cu partenerul tău de viață. Partenerii de firmă trebuie să aibă mare grijă, să își pună actele în regulă de la bun început așa încât, dacă este nevoie de o împărțire, să fie una corectă.".

References

External links
 Official site
  Intuitie business class – Camelia Sucu in Cariere
 Camelia Șucu, lecții de viață de la o femeie puternică: „Divorțul a venit ca o rezultantă a faptului că noi nu am fost buni prieteni, am fost foarte buni parteneri de business, dar nu am fost prieteni” - Camelia Șucu în LIFE.ro

Retail companies of Romania
Privately held companies of Romania
Romanian brands